A bur or burr is a type of seed or fruit with short, stiff bristles or hooks.

Bur, Burs, BUR, etc. may also refer to:

Places
 Baverd, also known as Būr, a village in Hormozgan Province, Iran
 Bur, Denmark, a railway town in West Jutland, Denmark
 Bur, Iran, a village in Hamadan Province
 Bur, Yemen, a village in the Hadhramaut Governorate
 Bur (river), Yakutia, Russia
 Burkina Faso, "BUR" is the International Olympic Committee country code for the country in Africa

Transportation
 Hollywood Burbank Airport, in Burbank, California, with IATA airport code BUR

Other
 MGK Bur, a Russian grenade launcher
 Burmese language (ISO 639-2 code)
 Burs (Dacia), a Germanic tribe
 BUR, an abbreviation of a type of roof covering system on flat roofs called a built up roof
 BUR, an abbreviation of Biblioteca Universale Rizzoli, an imprint of Rizzoli Libri
 Bur or Burr (cutter), a small cutter used in rotary tools for metalworking
 Burl in US English, the equivalent of burr or bur in UK English, an irregular growth in trees

See also
Burr (disambiguation)